Huston Township is a township in Clearfield County, Pennsylvania, United States. The population was 1,268 at the 2020 census.

The unincorporated village of Penfield is located in Huston Township. It is the site of the headquarters for the nearby Moshannon State Forest.

Geography

Communities
Hollywood
Hoovertown
Mill Run
Mt. Pleasant
Penfield
Tyler
Winterburn

Demographics

As of the census of 2000, there were 1,468 people, 607 households, and 417 families residing in the township.  The population density was 23.1 people per square mile (8.9/km).  There were 985 housing units at an average density of 15.5/sq mi (6.0/km).  The racial makeup of the township was 99.66% White, 0.07% Asian, 0.07% Pacific Islander, and 0.20% from two or more races.

There were 607 households, out of which 31.0% had children under the age of 18 living with them, 55.4% were married couples living together, 8.2% had a female householder with no husband present, and 31.3% were non-families. 26.2% of all households were made up of individuals, and 11.7% had someone living alone who was 65 years of age or older.  The average household size was 2.42 and the average family size was 2.93.

In the township the population was spread out, with 23.4% under the age of 18, 6.8% from 18 to 24, 30.0% from 25 to 44, 23.8% from 45 to 64, and 15.9% who were 65 years of age or older.  The median age was 38 years. For every 100 females, there were 101.1 males.  For every 100 females age 18 and over, there were 96.5 males.

The median income for a household in the township was $32,614, and the median income for a family was $40,000. Males had a median income of $29,946 versus $19,118 for females. The per capita income for the township was $16,734.  About 6.4% of families and 9.8% of the population were below the poverty line, including 14.3% of those under age 18 and 9.5% of those age 65 or over.

Education
Children in Huston Township attend the Dubois Area School District.

References

Populated places established in 1812
Townships in Clearfield County, Pennsylvania
Townships in Pennsylvania